Teresa Yan-Yi Woo-Paw (born October 29, 1958) is a Canadian politician and former Member of the Legislative Assembly of Alberta representing the constituency of Calgary-Northern Hills as a Progressive Conservative.

Early life
Woo-Paw was born in Hong Kong. She graduated from the University of Calgary in 1982 with a Bachelor of Social Work degree and has been an active member of the Calgary-Mackay community for more than 30 years.

Professional career
Prior to her election to the Legislature, Woo-Paw was employed as a private consultant providing diversity training, program facilitation and instruction. Throughout her career, she has worked for the Calgary Health Region, Cultural Diversity Institute, United Way of Calgary, the Canadian Red Cross, Calgary Board of Education, the Calgary Immigrant Women's Association and the Calgary Immigrant Aid Society. She has also founded six organizations, and served with several others. Amongst them are:
 Calgary Chamber of Voluntary Organizations
 Calgary Chinese Cultural Centre
 Alberta Wild Rose Foundation
 Society for Cultural And Multicultural Programs
 Calgary Chinese Community Service Association (founding member)
 Southern Alberta Asian Heritage Foundation (founding member)
 Ethno-Cultural Council of Calgary (founding Co-Chair)

Political career
Woo-Paw first sought public office in 1995 for the position of Public School Board Trustee for Wards 3 and 4 with the Calgary Board of Education (CBE), of which she was also the Chair. She ran for the position of Member of the Legislative Assembly of Alberta for the first time in the 2008 provincial election in the constituency of Calgary-Mackay. In that election, she received 48% of the vote. Woo-Paw served as deputy-chair of the Standing Committee on Private Bills as well as a member of the Cabinet Policy Committee on Public Safety and Services, the Standing Committee on Public Safety and Services, and the Standing Committee on Public Accounts.

In 2013, Woo-Paw was a member of the Executive Council of Alberta.

Personal life
Woo-Paw is married to Borick Paw. The couple has three adult children: Jadine, Jason and Cordelia. Her active community involvement has earned her many prestigious awards including the Alberta Centennial Commemorative Award, the Queen's Jubilee Award for Multiculturalism and Community Services, the YWCA's Women of Distinction Award, the Immigrant of Distinction Award and Canada 125th Commemorative Award for Community Services.

Election results

References

1958 births
Living people
Hong Kong emigrants to Canada
Naturalized citizens of Canada
Progressive Conservative Association of Alberta MLAs
Women MLAs in Alberta
Women government ministers of Canada
Members of the Executive Council of Alberta
21st-century Canadian politicians
21st-century Canadian women politicians